These are the official results of the Men's 5,000 metres event at the 1990 European Championships in Split, Yugoslavia, held at Stadion Poljud on 30 August and 1 September 1990.

Medalists

Results

Final
1 September
Italy's Salvatore Antibo, who was the strongest pre-race favourite to win also this final, having taken the 10,000-metre European title with a solo run, fell at the start, and therefore had to run faster than the other runners for the first 700 metres, in order to catch them.  Portugal's Domingos Castro first led the race, but soon thereafter France's Cyrille Laventure took the lead.  Laventure was still leading the race at 3,000 metres in 8:09.15, and at 4,000 metres in 10:53.34.  Despite the moderate pace, almost all runners were still in the lead group at this point.  On the second last back straight, Castro accelerated past Laventure into the lead, and the main group's runners started to string out.  Castro was still leading the race at 4,600 metres, in an informal time of 12:26.2 or 12:26.3.  Antibo, Britain's Gary Staines, Poland's Slawomir Majusiak, Laventure, and Finland's Risto Ulmala were chasing Castro.  On the final back straight, Staines tried to sprint past Antibo, who accelerated into the lead, leaving Castro behind.  At the start of the final bend, Staines sprinted past Antibo.  In the second half of the bend, however, Antibo furiously kicked past Staines.  Some metres behind the leading duo, Majusiak accelerated past the fading Castro.  Several metres behind the second pair of runners, Sweden's Jonny Danielsson passed Ulmala.  Despite celebrating his victory in the final metres, Antibo defeated Staines by almost half a second, while Majusiak secured the bronze medal.  Danielsson ran the home straight several metres faster than the exhausted Castro, but he still lost to the tiny Portuguese runner by under 0.2 seconds.  (The Big European Championships Book / Suuri EM-kirja (Finland, c. 1990); https://www.youtube.com/watch?v=8P_fSAPbYgM  Salvatore Antibo vince i 5.000 a Spalato 90.)

Heats
30 August

Heat 1

Heat 2

Participation
According to an unofficial count, 32 athletes from 19 countries participated in the event.

 (1)
 (1)
 (2)
 (3)
 (2)
 (3)
 (1)
 (1)
 (2)
 (1)
 (3)
 (1)
 (3)
 (1)
 (1)
 (1)
 (3)
 (1)
 (1)

See also
 1988 Men's Olympic 5,000 metres (Seoul)
 1991 Men's World Championships 5,000 metres (Tokyo)
 1992 Men's Olympic 5,000 metres (Barcelona)

References

 Results
 Todor Results

5000
5000 metres at the European Athletics Championships